Valery Teziyovych Pyatnitsky is Ukrainian politician and statesman. Government's Commissioner for European Integration (since 2011).

Biography

Early years. Education. Scientific activity 

Valery Pyatnitsky was born April 19, 1962 in Chervona Motovylivka (Fastiv Raion, Kyiv Oblast, Ukrainian SSR).

In 1985 graduated from faculty of cybernetics in Taras Shevchenko State University of Kyiv (specialty «Economic Cybernetics», qualification «economist-mathematician»).

During 1987–1990 – PhD student of Taras Shevchenko State University of Kyiv. in 1999–2002 – doctorant in Kyiv National University of Trade and Economics.

Candidate of Economics Sciences. Docent.

Career 

1985–1986: engineer in Scientific and Research part of Taras Shevchenko State University of Kyiv
1986–1987: trainee-teacher, Department of Economic Cybernetics, Taras Shevchenko State University of Kyiv
1987 – engineer in Laboratory of economic cybernetics (Scientific and Research part of Taras Shevchenko State University of Kyiv)
1990–1996: assistant, docent (Chair of economic cybernetics, Faculty of Economics, Taras Shevchenko State University of Kyiv)
1996–1999: deputy chairman of department – chairman of section, deputy chairman of Department of Multilateral Economic Cooperation (Ministry of Foreign Economic Relations and Trade of Ukraine)
1999–2003: docent of chair (Kyiv National University of Trade and Economics)
2003 – state secretary for European Integration (Ministry of Economy and European Integration of Ukraine)
2003–2005: 1st deputy minister of Economy and European Integration of Ukraine, deputy chairman of the Joint Parliamentary-Government Committee of Ukraine's integration into the WTO
2005 – adviser of Vice Prime Minister of Ukraine, a leading expert of the «Trade policy in Ukraine» project
2005–2011: deputy minister of Economy of Ukraine
Since July 13, 2011 – Government's Commissioner for European Integration

Pyatnitsky was appointed by the Yatsenyuk Government to lead the (newly created) Institution of Trade Representative in Ukraine on 20 August 2014. Then Minister of Economical Development and Trade Pavlo Sheremeta disagreed with this appointment and resigned over it (he felt that he as Minister himself should have nominated candidates for his deputies) on 21 August 2014.

Awards 

Order of Prince Yaroslav the Wise (5th class, 2008).

References

External links 
Biography on website of Ministry of Economic Development and Trade (Ukraine) 
Pyatnitsky Valery Teziyovych 

1962 births
Living people
Ministry of Economic Development, Trade and Agriculture
Recipients of the Order of Prince Yaroslav the Wise, 5th class
Kyiv National University of Trade and Economics people